Stephanie Berman-Eisenberg (born May 13, 1972) is an American businesswoman who has been President/CEO of Carrfour Supportive Housing since 2006.

Education
Berman-Eisenberg has a master's degree in administration, planning, and social policy from Harvard University's Graduate School of Education, and a bachelor's degree from Brandeis University.

Career
In 2011, Berman-Eisenberg co-founded Operation Sacred Trust, a collaboration of social service agencies seeking to disrupt homelessness for South Florida veteran families. Between 2011 and 2020, the public-private collaboration succeeded in winning more than $15 million in federal grant funds for the initiative from the U.S. Department of Veterans Affairs Supportive Services for Veteran Families program to provide housing prevention and rapid rehousing services to more than 8,000 very low-income veterans and their family members in Broward and Miami-Dade counties.

Berman-Eisenberg oversees a current inventory of more than 2,300 supportive and affordable housing units valued at more than $500 million.

She serves on the City of Miami Beach Affordable Housing Committee, Greater Miami Chamber of Commerce Affordable Housing Committee, and the JPMorgan Chase Community Advisory Committee. In 2011, The Miami Herald named her as one of South Florida's "20 most influential leaders under the age of 40." In 2017, she was selected for The Miami Herald's CEO Roundtable. Berman-Eisenberg was named one of the most "Influential Business Women" by the South Florida Business Journal in 2013 and 2014. 

In April 2020, Berman-Eisenberg urged policy-makers to rapidly respond to COVID-19's impact on a South Florida housing market that was already stressed. "Our community did not have enough affordable housing before the pandemic and we are not prepared for the onslaught that is coming our way."

Personal life
Berman-Eisenberg, a native of Miami Beach, is married and has a son and two stepsons. She lives in North Miami Beach, Florida.

References

External links
 Carrfour Supportive Housing

1972 births
Living people
People from Miami
Harvard Graduate School of Education alumni
Brandeis University alumni
American women chief executives
American nonprofit chief executives
Homelessness activists